Institute of Strength Physics and Materials Science of the Siberian Division of the Russian Academy of Sciences—one of the institutes of the Tomsk Research Center of the Siberian Division of the Russian Academy of Sciences. It is located in Tomsk Academic City. The Institute consists of 5 buildings with a total area of 18,487 square meters. The Institute has 15 research laboratories, the center of collective use "Nanotech", the international centre for research on physical mesomechanics, materials, the Interdisciplinary Science and Technology Center "Welding", the Testing Laboratory "Metal-Test", and 2 scientific and technological departments.

History

 1979 – Department of Solid State Physics and Materials under the leadership of Viktor Panin at the Institute of Atmospheric Optics, SD of the Academy of Sciences of the USSR
 1984 – Is released Institute of Strength Physics and Material Sciences of the SB USSR from the Institute of Atmospheric Optics. It was headed by Viktor Panin
 1985 – Is created the Republican Engineering Technical Center (RETC) at IMPA of the SB USSR
 1991 – Is established Russian Material Center based on the ISPMS SB RAS
 1994 to 1997 – Institute had the status of the State Scientific Center of Russian Federation
 1998 – the Institute began to publish an international scientific journal "" in Russian and "Physical Mesomechanics" in English.
 2002 – Director of the Institute elected a PhD (Doctor of Sciences) in Physics and Mathematics Professor Sergey Psakhie. Decree of the Presidium of the RAS Academician Viktor Panin was appointed scientific director of the Institute
 2007 – English version of the journal Physical Mesomechanics published by international publisher Elsevier

Activities undertaken at the Institute
 In 2009. the Institute celebrated the 25th anniversary. In this connection, on September 7–9, 2009, it held an international conference on physical mesomechanics, computer design and development of new materials.
 The Council of Young Scientists and Specialists of the ISPMS SD RAS holds an annual competition of research papers in two categories: the work presented in Russian and the work presented in English.

 Graduate students and staff of the Institute weekly in the evenings go play volleyball and basketball in the gym of the Tomsk Research Center.
 Annually, the Institute carries out a corporate new year in the House of Scientists, which is located in the Tomsk Akademgorodok.
 The Council of Young Scientists and Specialists if the ISPMS SD RAS participates annually in celebration of the foundation of the TomskAkademgorodok. Preparing a cultural program and art.

Institute staff
The Institute has 420 employees (146 researchers, including 1 academician of the Academy of Sciences, 44 PhD (doctors of science) and 90 PhD (candidates of science), the number of graduate students in 10 specialties — 40.

Directorate
 Director — Sergey Psakhie, DSc (doctor of science) in physics and mathematics, Professor.
 Adviser of the Russian Academy of Sciences—Viktor Panin, DSc in physics and mathematics, Professor, Full Member  of the Russian Academy of Sciences.
 Deputy Director for Science
 Lev Zuev, DSc in physics and mathematics, Professor.
 Lotkov Alexander, DSc in physics and mathematics, Professor.
 Scientific Secretary — Vasiliy Pleshanov, DSc in technology, Associate Professor.

Structure

 Laboratory of Physical mesomechanics and non-destructive methods of control
 Laboratory of Mechanics of heterogeneous media
 Laboratory of Materials science of shape memory alloys
 Laboratory of Physics of structural transformations
 Laboratory of Physics of Strength
 Laboratory of Physics of surface hardening
 Laboratory of Physical materials
 Laboratory of Physics of nanostructured biocomposites
 Laboratory of Computer design of materials
 Laboratory of Physics of nanostructured ceramic materials
 Laboratory of Physics of nonlinear media
 Laboratory of Physics of surface phenomena
 Laboratory of Composite materials
 Laboratory of Polymer composite materials
 Laboratory of Physical chemistry of powder materials
 Laboratory of Materials science and nanotechnology coatings
 Laboratory of Methods for coating
 Laboratory of Physical chemistry of finely
 International Centre for Research on Physical mesomechanics materials
 Interdisciplinary Science and Technology Center "Welding"

See also
 Akademgorodok (Tomsk)
 Tomsk
 Education in Siberia

External links
 Institute website
 ISPMS in SB RAS
 Institute Wiki
 Institute Wiki (In Russian) 
 Institute Wiki (Google translation from Russian)
 Tomsk Wiki
 Tomsk Wiki (In Russian)
 Tomsk Wiki (Google translation from Russian)

Physics institutes
Tomsk
Institutes of the Russian Academy of Sciences
Research institutes in the Soviet Union
1984 establishments in the Soviet Union
Research institutes established in 1984